The Wilcox Building is a building located in downtown Portland, Oregon, listed on the National Register of Historic Places. The building was designed by Whidden and Lewis. The design is similar to the Failing Office Building (1907) and Stevens Building (1914), also by Whidden and Lewis.

See also
 National Register of Historic Places listings in Southwest Portland, Oregon

References

External links
 

1911 establishments in Oregon
Buildings and structures completed in 1911
Chicago school architecture in Oregon
Commercial Style architecture in the United States
National Register of Historic Places in Portland, Oregon
Portland Historic Landmarks
Southwest Portland, Oregon